Newton St Cyres railway station is a railway station serving the village of Newton St Cyres, Devon, England. It is served by Great Western Railway trains on the Tarka and Dartmoor lines.

History
The Exeter and Crediton Railway was opened on 12 May 1851 but this, the only intermediate station, was not opened until October 1851. At the time it was named just 'St Cyres'. Only one track was in use at the time due to a dispute a dispute over the track gauge and this served the platform on the north side of the railway. The ticket office and facilities were in a wooden building which was probably moved from Cowley where the railway had intended to open a temporary terminus in 1848 but were unable to do so.

The line towards Exeter was doubled and a signal box provided from 23 February 1875, then the line towards Crediton was doubled from 2 June 1875. The station was renamed as Newton St Cyres on 1 October 1913.

The signal box was closed on 17 August 1930 when the signalling equipment was transferred into the booking office. The goods yard closed on 12 September 1960 and the signals taken out of use on 31 July 1968. The line became just a single track again on 16 December 1984.

The platform on the south side is still in place but disused. The former station master's house is now in private use. The former Station Hotel is now named "The Beer Engine". It is the oldest micro-brewery in Devon.

Description 
The station is located next to a bridge that carries a minor road that leads north from the village of Newton St Cyres. The platform that is in use is on the north side of the line and has a waiting shelter. There is no ticket machine or other facilities and the station is unstaffed.

Services
All services at Newton St Cyres are operated by Great Western Railway.

Community railway
The railway between Exeter and Barnstaple is promoted as the Tarka Line. It is designated as a community railway and is supported by the Devon and Cornwall Rail Partnership.

References

Railway stations in Devon
Railway stations in Great Britain opened in 1851
Former London and South Western Railway stations
Railway stations served by Great Western Railway
Railway request stops in Great Britain
1851 establishments in England
DfT Category F2 stations